Wooday P. Krishna is an Indian educationist, technocrat and social activist. Krishna is also the Honorary General Secretary of Seshadripuram Educational Trust, President, Karnataka Gandhi Smarak Nidhi, Former Chairman Gandhi Peace Foundation and  former Chairman, The Institution of Engineers (India), Karnataka State Centre. He has served as a member of State Disaster Management Authority, Government of Karnataka in the rank of Minister of State, to develop proactive mitigating strategies for any disasters in the State.

Krishna is a recipient of the President’s Gold Medal, the highest National Award given for Red Cross humanitarian work of high order in 2012 from the Honourable President of India and the prestigious State Rajyotsava Award in 2004 for social work from the Government of Karnataka.  He has been elected Fellow, World Academy of Productivity Science, Canada in recognition of his contributions to productivity improvement in the delivery of humanitarian services. In 2020 he has been conferred with the prestigious Nadoja Award which is equivalent to Honorary degree of Doctor of Literature (D.Litt.) by Kannada University, Hampi.

Early and personal life
Krishna was born in 1963 in Bangalore, Karnataka to father Late W. H. Puttiah, a merchant and freedom fighter and mother Late Doddammaiya. He is married to Dr.G.Savitha.
Krishna attended Sri Ramkrishna Vidyashala in Mysuru; and is a Doctorate (Ph.D) in Management'  and a post-graduate in Engineering, Law, Sociology and Journalism. At school he was influenced by the principles of Swami Vivekananda and later by Raja Rammohun Roy.

Career
Krishna is a well-known and nationally recognized educationist. He has provided leadership to the Seshadripuram Educational Trust (SET) that comprises 34 educational institutions spread across Bengaluru, Mysuru, Tumakuru and Mandya Districts and was established in 1930 by a group of women as a primary school named Seshadripuram Stree Samaja. He has been involved with Indian Red Cross Society, The Tuberculosis Association of India, Gandhi Peace Foundation, and The Institution of Engineers (India) at the national level; .

A Chartered Engineer of more than three decades standing, he is also a  well-known technical arbitrator.

Krishna authored a book named Sir M Visvesvaraya Jeevana Sadhane that was released on National Science Day in 2009.

Recognition
 2002 – Kempegowda Award from Bangalore Mahanagara Palike for Education  
 2004 – State Rajyotsava Award from Government of Karnataka – for social work
 2005 – Red Cross Award from the Honourable Governor of Karnataka – for humanitarian services
 2011 – Eminent Engineer Award from The Institution of Engineers – for contribution in the field of Engineering.
 2012 – President's Gold Medal from Honourable President of India for Red Cross humanitarian work
 2014 – Fellowship of the Institution of Engineering and Technology, United Kingdom
 2017 – The Doyen’s Award from the Hindu Group in recognition of his exemplary contribution to make education inclusive, and change the landscape of education in Karnataka
 2020 –  Honorary degree Nadoja by Kannada University, Hampi. Conferred the honorary degree by His Excellency Sri Vajubhai Rudabhai Vala, Governor of Karnataka and Chancellor of Kannada University, Hampi

References

External links
 

20th-century Indian educational theorists
1963 births
Social workers
Scholars from Bangalore
Living people
Social workers from Karnataka
Recipients of the Rajyotsava Award 2004